HMS Barnstaple was a Hunt class minesweeper of the Royal Navy from World War I.

She served as Lady Cynthia after major modifications as a coastal steamship with the Union Steamship Company of British Columbia, Canada from 1925 to 1957.

See also
 Barnstaple

References
 

 

Hunt-class minesweepers (1916)
Royal Navy ship names
1919 ships